Knattspyrnufélagið Ægir is an Icelandic sports club from the town of Þorlákshöfn, mainly known for its football team. The club has a football team playing in the third tier of Icelandic football.

Players

Current squad

References

External links
Knattspyrnufélagið Ægir – Official website

Football clubs in Iceland
Association football clubs established in 1987
1987 establishments in Iceland